Singing in the Wind may refer to:

The sounds produced by overhead power line wires due to wind vortex shedding
Singing in the Wind, a poem by Robert E. Howard
Singing in the Wind, a collection of poetry by Yu Fu